Kees Smit (born 21 January 2006) is a Dutch footballer who plays for Jong AZ in the Eerste Divisie as a midfielder.

Career
From Heiloo, Smit joined the academy at AZ Alkmaar at nine years-old in 2015. He then became the youngest member of their under-12 squad. After progressing through the ranks at AZ, he signed a three and-a-half year professional contract in January 2021. 

In December 2022, Smit was included with the first team squad on their mid-season break travelling training party to Valencia, Spain. In January 2023, a goal Smit scored in a five-a-side indoor game went viral due to its unusual nature, as he beat the outrushing goalkeeper with shot rebounded from the side wall. Later that month, Smit made his professional debut for Jong AZ in the Eerste Divisie in a home match against Helmond Sport, on January 23, 2023.

With AZ under-19s playing in the UEFA Youth League he was part of the team that beat Barcelona and Real Madrid on consecutive rounds to reach the semi-finals in March 2023. Smit scored a long range goal in the UEFA Youth League last-sixteen tie against Barcelona that brought praise.

International career
In November 2021, Smit played for the Netherlands national under-16 football team against the Belgian under-16s. Smit has since been selected for the Dutch U17s.

References

2006 births
Living people
Dutch footballers
Footballers from North Holland
Association football midfielders
Netherlands youth international footballers
Eerste Divisie players
Jong AZ players